N. M. Rothschild may refer to:
 Nathan Mayer Rothschild
 Nathan Rothschild, 1st Baron Rothschild
 N M Rothschild & Sons

See also
 Rothschild